This article is about the particular significance of the year 1970 to Wales and its people.

Incumbents

Secretary of State for Wales – George Thomas (until 20 June); Peter Thomas
Archbishop of Wales – Glyn Simon, Bishop of Llandaff
Archdruid of the National Eisteddfod of Wales – Tilsli

Events
11 January – The last trolleybuses run on the Cardiff trolleybus system, the last such system in Wales.
23 May – The 120-year-old Britannia Bridge built by Robert Stephenson across the Menai Strait is destroyed by fire.
2 June – During the construction of the Cleddau Bridge, a cantilever collapses, resulting in the deaths of four workers. It is the last major bridge disaster in the UK.
18 June – In the UK General Election:
S. O. Davies, having resigned from the Labour Party, retains his Parliamentary seat of Merthyr Tydfil, standing as an Independent Labour candidate.
Gwynfor Evans loses his seat at Carmarthen.
Jim Griffiths retires as MP for Llanelli, to be replaced by Denzil Davies.
Nigel Birch retires from the House of Commons, to be created Baron Rhyl.
25 October – Pope Paul VI canonizes the Forty Martyrs of England and Wales, who include the priests Philip Evans and John Lloyd, John Jones, David Lewis, John Roberts, and the teacher Richard Gwyn. 
Dr Phil Williams becomes the first Chairman of Plaid Cymru.

Arts and literature
Robert Plant and Jimmy Page retreat to Bron-Yr-Aur to write songs for Led Zeppelin III.

Awards
Bernice Rubens wins the Booker Prize for The Elected Member.
National Eisteddfod of Wales (held in Ammanford)
National Eisteddfod of Wales: Chair – Tomi Evans, "Y Twrch Trwyth"
National Eisteddfod of Wales: Crown – Bryan Martin Davies, "Darluniau ar Gynfas"
National Eisteddfod of Wales: Prose Medal – withheld

New books

English language
Ron Berry – So Long, Hector Bebb
Tom Earley – The Sad Mountain
Menna Gallie – You're Welcome to Ulster!
Sally Roberts Jones – Turning Away
John Ormond – Requiem and Celebration
Harri Webb – The Green Desert

Welsh language
Marion Eames – Y Stafell Ddirgel
J. Gwyn Griffiths – Cerddi Cairo
John Robert Jones – Ac Onide
R. Williams Parry – Yr Haf a Cherddi Eraill
Gwynne Williams – Rhwng Gewyn ac Asgwrn
T. Wilson Evans – Iwan Tudur

Music
Badfinger – No Dice (featuring the original recording of "Without You")
John Cale – Vintage Violence
Meic Stevens – Outlander
Shakin' Stevens and the Sunsets – A Legend

Film
Stanley Baker stars in The Games.
Hugh Griffith appears in Start the Revolution Without Me.

Welsh-language films
None

Broadcasting
6 April – HTV starts broadcasting in colour from the Wenvoe transmitting station and from this day becomes known on air as HTV rather than Harlech Television.
Coverage of the Llangollen International Eisteddfod is the first colour programme to be made by BBC Wales.

Welsh-language television
Fo a Fe makes a star of Ryan Davies, who goes on to make three series of Ryan a Ronnie in Welsh with his partner Ronnie Williams.

English-language television

Sport
Boxing – Eddie Avoth wins the Commonwealth lightweight title.
Show Jumping – David Broome wins the individual Show Jumping World Championship.
Snooker – Ray Reardon wins the World Professional Snooker Championship for the first time.
David Broome wins BBC Wales Sports Personality of the Year.

Births
1 January – Brian Law, footballer
7 March – Cameron Toshack, footballer
19 March – Tracey Hinton, athlete
2 April – Jason Perry, footballer
15 April – Rebecca John, television presenter
19 May – Stuart Cable, rock musician and television presenter (died 2010) 
25 May – Robert Croft, cricketer
18 June – Lucy Owen, television presenter
22 June – Paul Davies, snooker player
18 July – Gruff Rhys, rock musician
27 July (in England) – David Davies, politician
30 July – Alun Cairns, politician
9 August – Lee Jones, football goalkeeper
19 August – Me One (Eric Martin), singer-songwriter and rapper
26 September – Kevin Lloyd, footballer
October – Helen Stokes-Lampard, chair of the Royal College of General Practitioners
11 October (in England) – Andy Marriott, goalkeeper
14 November – Derwyn Jones, rugby union player
27 November – Stephen Evans, actor and comedy writer
29 December – Aled Jones, singer and radio presenter
31 December – Louise Rickard, rugby union player

Deaths
3 January – Trefor Morgan, financier, 55
4 January – David John Williams (D. J. Williams), author and Plaid Cymru politician, 84
23 January – Ifan ab Owen Edwards, founder of the Urdd, 74
26 January – Albert Evans-Jones (Cynan), poet, 74
2 February – Bertrand Russell, philosopher, 97
16 February – Bil Perry, Wales international rugby player, 83
22 February – Roddy Hughes, actor, 78
20 April – Thomas Iorwerth Ellis, academic, 70
29 April – Bryn Evans, Welsh rugby international, 68
7 May
Annie Davies, radio and TV producer, 59
Jack Jones, novelist, 75
30 May – John Edward Jones, Plaid Cymru leader, 64
3 June – John Robert Jones, philosophy professor, 58
4 June – Daniel John Davies, Independent minister and poet, 84
9 June – Billy Spiller, cricketer and rugby player, 83
10 July – Isaac Griffiths, politician in Canada, 78
3 August – Sir Lincoln Evans, trade unionist, 80
26 August – Thomas Mardy Jones, miner and politician, 91
10 October – Owen Picton Davies, journalist, 88
8 November – Huw T. Edwards, trade union leader and politician, 77
17 November – Naunton Wayne, actor, 69
9 November – Huw T. Edwards, trade union leader and politician, 77

See also
1970 in Northern Ireland

References

 
Wales
 Wales